The Men's 4 × 100 metre medley relay competition of the swimming events at the 2015 World Aquatics Championships was held on 9 August with the heats and final.

Records
Prior to the competition, the existing world and championship records were as follows.

Results

Heats
The heats were held at 10:27.

Final
The final was held at 19:07.

References

Men's 4 x 100 metre medley relay